Peter Stewart Lane, Baron Lane of Horsell, FCA (29 January 1925 – 9 January 2009) was a British politician and businessman.

A Conservative Member of the House of Lords, he was created a life peer on 17 July 1990 as Baron Lane of Horsell, of Woking in the County of Surrey.

After a spell in the Royal Navy, he trained as an accountant and rose to be senior partner of Binder Hamlyn from 1979 to 1992. He was an active freemason.

He was chairman of the executive of the National Union of the Conservative Party from 1986 and 1991 and had previously chaired the traumatic party conference in 1983 during which Cecil Parkinson resigned after his affair with Sara Keays had become public.

Later in life he was also chairman of Action on Addiction and the Nuffield Hospital, and held a number of directorships.

Arms

Notes

References 
 
 Daily Telegraph obituary, 1 February 2009 

1925 births
2009 deaths
Conservative Party (UK) life peers
English accountants
Freemasons of the United Grand Lodge of England
Knights Bachelor
20th-century English businesspeople
20th-century Royal Navy personnel
Life peers created by Elizabeth II